Siah Correa Hemphill is an American politician, educator, and school psychologist who is a member of the New Mexico Senate from the 28th district. Elected in 2020, she assumed office after the resignation of her predecessor in December 2020.

Early life and education 
Hemphill was born and raised in Grant County, New Mexico. She earned a Bachelor of Arts degree in elementary education and Master of Arts in school psychology from Western New Mexico University.

Career 
Prior to entering politics, Hemphill worked as an educator for 25 years. In October 2019, Hemphill announced her intention to challenge incumbent Democrat Gabriel Ramos in the 2020 election. Hemphill defeated Ramos in the primary, and defeated Republican nominee James Williams in the November general election.

Personal life 
Hemphill and her husband, Jay Hemphill, have four children. One of Hemphill’s sons was born with a genetic disorder and several disabilities.

References 

Hispanic and Latino American state legislators in New Mexico
Hispanic and Latino American women in politics
Living people
Year of birth missing (living people)
Democratic Party New Mexico state senators
Women state legislators in New Mexico
Western New Mexico University alumni
People from Grant County, New Mexico
21st-century American politicians
21st-century American women politicians